Kavaklıpınar is a village in the Mersin Province, Turkey. It's part of Toroslar district (which is an intracity district within Mersin city). It is situated in the Toros Mountains. The population of the village  is 284  as of 2012.

References

External links
For images

Villages in Toroslar District